Geoffrey Enyinnaya Okoroafor  is an Anglican bishop in Nigeria.

Okoroafor was elected Bishop of Egbu on 11 January  2013 at Agbarha-Otor, Delta State.

Notes

State University of New York alumni
Living people
Anglican bishops of Egbu
21st-century Anglican bishops in Nigeria
Year of birth missing (living people)